Amarna letter EA 15, titled Assyria Joins the International Scene, is a shorter-length clay tablet Amarna letter from Ashur-uballit I of the Land of Assyria, (line 3 of EA 15). He addresses the Pharaoh in line 1, the "King (of) Land Miṣri-(Egypt)", thus the use of "Land (of) Assyria".

This short letter is synoptic with much information. It discusses the Assyrian messenger's reason for going to Egypt, "to see" the land, and report back to the Assyrian king. The letter speaks of a short history of not sending a messenger, or the two kingdoms talking, for some recent times. Besides the duties of the messenger to see, and report back, a list of "greeting gifts", shulmani, or "peace-gifts" are sent by Ashur-uballit I to the Pharaoh.

The letter

EA 15: Assyria Joins the International Scene
EA 15, letter one of two from Assyria. (Not a linear, line-by-line translation.)

(Lines 1-6)--Say to the king of the land of E[gypt]: Thus Aššur-ubal[lit, the king of the land of (the god) A]ššur. For you, your household, for your land, your chariot-forces, your armies, may all be well.
(7-15)--I have sent my messenger to you to visit you and to visit your land. Up to now, my predecessors have not written; today, I have written to you. [I] send you a splendid chariot, 2 horses, and 1 date-stone of genuine lapis lazuli as your greeting gift (shulmani).
(16-22)--Do [no]t delay the messenger whom I have sent to you for a visit. He should visit and then leave for here. He should see what you are like and what your land is like, and then leave for here.--(complete, with minor lacunas, lines 1-22)

Akkadian text

The Akkadian language text:

Akkadian:

Obverse:
(Line 1): A-na 1.diš-LUGAL KUR Mi-iṣ-ri-
(2): qi-bi-[ ma ]
(3): umma 1.d-A-šur-TI-L[A LUGAL KUR dA]-šur-ma
(4): ana ka-ša É-ka ana KUR-ka
(5): ana giš-GIGIR-MEŠ-ka ù ERIM-MEŠ-ka
(6): lu-ú šul-mu
segue:
(7): DUMU ši-ip-ri-ia al-tap-ra-ak-ku
(8): ana a-ma-ri-ka ù KUR-ka ana a-ma-ri
(9): adi an-ni-ša ab-ba-ú-ia
(10): lā iš-pu-ru
segue:
(11): u4-ma a-na-ku al-tap-ra-ak-ku
(12): 1.-giš-GIGIR SIG5-ta 2.-ANŠE.KUR.RA.MEŠ
(13): [ ù ] NA4-ú-hi-na ša NA4-ZA.GÌN KUR-e
(14): [ a-n]a šul-ma-ni-ka
(15): [ ú ]-še-bi-la-[ ku ]

Lower Edge:
(16): [ DUMU ši- ]-ip-ri ša aš-pu-ra-ku-ni
(17): ana a-ma-ri

Reverse:
(18): [ l]ā tu4-ka-[ as ]-sú
(19): [ l]i-mu-ur ù li-it-tal-ka
(20): [ ṭ]e-em-ka ù ṭe-em
(21): ma-ti-ka li-mur
(22): ù li-it-ta-al-ka

See also
Ashur-uballit I
Ashur-uballit II
Amarna letters–phrases and quotations
List of Amarna letters by size
Amarna letter EA 5, EA 9, EA 15, EA 19, EA 26, EA 27, EA 35, EA 38 
EA 153, EA 161, EA 288, EA 364, EA 365, EA 367

Notes

References

Moran, William L. The Amarna Letters. Johns Hopkins University Press, 1987, 1992. (softcover)
 Metropolitan Museum of Art.  Cuneiform Texts in the Metropolitan Museum of Art:  Tablets, Cones, and Bricks of the Third and Second Millennia B.C., vol. 1 (New York, 1988).  The final section (Bricks) of the book concerns  cylinder Seals, with a foreword describing the purpose of the section as to instigate Research into cylinder Seals.  The 'cylinder sealing' on the bricks, was done multiple times per brick. Some are of high quality, and some are not.  (Also contains the only 2 el Amarna letters, in the USA, with Analysis.)

Photo gallery of EA 15

External links

Photo, EA 15: Obverse
Metropolitan Museum of Art entry for EA 15, Photo, Specifications, etc.
CDLI entry of EA 15 ( Chicago Digital Library Initiative )
CDLI listing of all EA Amarna letters, 1-382

Amarna letters
Middle Assyrian Empire
Manuscripts of the Metropolitan Museum of Art
2nd millennium BC in Assyria